Newspapers in Israel are mostly in Hebrew, but there are also newspapers catering to Arabic speakers, and newspapers catering to immigrants speaking a variety of languages, such as Russian, English and French. In 2022, a TGI survey indicated that Israel Hayom, distributed for free, is Israel's most read newspaper, with a 31% weekday readership exposure, followed by Yedioth Ahronoth, with 23.9%, Haaretz with 4.7%, and Maariv with 3.5%.

History
, the first Hebrew-language newspaper in pre-state Israel, was published on February 20, 1863. About six months later, another Jerusalem weekly, HaHavatzelet, was founded by Israel Bak, who established the first Hebrew printing press in Jerusalem.

An analysis of the press of Palestine under the British Mandate in 1949 states: "Palestine was a special case in journalism. No other area with a population of two million, of whom at least 30 percent are illiterate, could boast of 18 morning dailies, three evening papers, and a host of weeklies, bi-weeklies and monthlies." 
 
In 2015, Reuters correspondent Tova Cohen described Israeli society in 2012 as "news-obsessed." Israel has a high newspaper readership rate, due to a combination of high literacy rate and a cultural interest in politics and current affairs. Average weekday readership of newspapers in Israel is around 21 papers per 100 people, although many Israelis end up reading more than one paper.

See also
List of newspapers in Israel
Mass media in Israel

References

Mass media in Israel
Newspapers published in Israel